This article features the 2004 UEFA European Under-19 Championship first qualifying round. 25 teams (12 group winners, 12 group runners-up and the third placed team that performed best against the numbers 1 and 2 of its group) qualified for the second qualifying round.

Byes
The following teams received a bye for this round:

 
 
 
  (main tournament host)

Group 1

All matches were played in Northern Ireland. This group brought forth the best third placed team. Hungary performed best against group winners and runners-up Slovenia and Romania, achieving 3 points and a goal difference of +2 (4-2).
{| cellspacing=1 width=70%
!width=25%| !!width=30%| !!width=15%| !!width=30%|
|-
|
|align=right|
|align=center|0–2
|
|-
|
|align=right|
|align=center|0–0
|
|-
|
|align=right|
|align=center|2–0
|
|-
|
|align=right|
|align=center|3–1
|
|-
|
|align=right|
|align=center|1–2
|
|-
|
|align=right|
|align=center|4–0
|

Group 2

All matches were played in Poland.
{| cellspacing=1 width=70%
!width=25%| !!width=30%| !!width=15%| !!width=30%|
|-
|
|align=right|
|align=center|3–0
|
|-
|
|align=right|
|align=center|4–1
|
|-
|
|align=right|
|align=center|1–0
|
|-
|
|align=right|
|align=center|2–3
|
|-
|
|align=right|
|align=center|0–1
|
|-
|
|align=right|
|align=center|2–4
|

Group 3

All matches were played in Estonia.
{| cellspacing=1 width=70%
!width=25%| !!width=30%| !!width=15%| !!width=30%|
|-
|
|align=right|
|align=center|3–0
|
|-
|
|align=right|
|align=center|2–0
|
|-
|
|align=right|
|align=center|3–0
|
|-
|
|align=right|
|align=center|0–1
|
|-
|
|align=right|
|align=center|1–3
|
|-
|
|align=right|
|align=center|1–8
|

Group 4

All matches were played in Germany.
{| cellspacing=1 width=70%
!width=25%| !!width=30%| !!width=15%| !!width=30%|
|-
|
|align=right|
|align=center|5–1
|
|-
|
|align=right|
|align=center|6–1
|
|-
|
|align=right|
|align=center|3–0
|
|-
|
|align=right|
|align=center|1–9
|
|-
|
|align=right|
|align=center|2–2
|
|-
|
|align=right|
|align=center|1–3
|

Group 5

All matches were played in Croatia.
{| cellspacing=1 width=70%
!width=25%| !!width=30%| !!width=15%| !!width=30%|
|-
|
|align=right|
|align=center|1–0
|
|-
|
|align=right|
|align=center|5–1
|
|-
|
|align=right|
|align=center|0–1
|
|-
|
|align=right|
|align=center|3–0
|
|-
|
|align=right|
|align=center|1–3
|
|-
|
|align=right|
|align=center|1–1
|

Group 6

All matches were played in San Marino.
{| cellspacing=1 width=70%
!width=25%| !!width=30%| !!width=15%| !!width=30%|
|-
|
|align=right|
|align=center|1–1
|
|-
|
|align=right|
|align=center|1–1
|
|-
|
|align=right|
|align=center|1–0
|
|-
|
|align=right|
|align=center|1–10
|
|-
|
|align=right|
|align=center|2–1
|
|-
|
|align=right|
|align=center|7–0
|

Group 7

All matches were played in Belarus.
{| cellspacing=1 width=70%
!width=25%| !!width=30%| !!width=15%| !!width=30%|
|-
|
|align=right|
|align=center|2–1
|
|-
|
|align=right|
|align=center|0–0
|
|-
|
|align=right|
|align=center|1–1
|
|-
|
|align=right|
|align=center|2–1
|
|-
|
|align=right|
|align=center|1–1
|
|-
|
|align=right|
|align=center|3–0
|

Group 8

All matches were played in Russia.
{| cellspacing=1 width=70%
!width=25%| !!width=30%| !!width=15%| !!width=30%|
|-
|
|align=right|
|align=center|2–0
|
|-
|
|align=right|
|align=center|3–0
|
|-
|
|align=right|
|align=center|4–0
|
|-
|
|align=right|
|align=center|0–6
|
|-
|
|align=right|
|align=center|0–1
|
|-
|
|align=right|
|align=center|1–3
|

Group 9

All matches were played in Sweden.
{| cellspacing=1 width=70%
!width=25%| !!width=30%| !!width=15%| !!width=30%|
|-
|
|align=right|
|align=center|2–2
|
|-
|
|align=right|
|align=center|1–0
|
|-
|
|align=right|
|align=center|7–1
|
|-
|
|align=right|
|align=center|2–2
|
|-
|
|align=right|
|align=center|3–3
|
|-
|
|align=right|
|align=center|2–9
|

Group 10

All matches were played in Moldova.
{| cellspacing=1 width=70%
!width=25%| !!width=30%| !!width=15%| !!width=30%|
|-
|
|align=right|
|align=center|1–1
|
|-
|
|align=right|
|align=center|1–1
|
|-
|
|align=right|
|align=center|2–1
|
|-
|
|align=right|
|align=center|0–0
|
|-
|
|align=right|
|align=center|2–0
|
|-
|
|align=right|
|align=center|3–2
|

Group 11

All matches were played in Ukraine.
{| cellspacing=1 width=70%
!width=25%| !!width=30%| !!width=15%| !!width=30%|
|-
|
|align=right|
|align=center|0–1
|
|-
|
|align=right|
|align=center|1–0
|
|-
|
|align=right|
|align=center|0–0
|
|-
|
|align=right|
|align=center|4–3
|
|-
|
|align=right|
|align=center|1–2
|
|-
|
|align=right|
|align=center|1–4
|

Group 12

All matches were played in Scotland.
{| cellspacing=1 width=70%
!width=25%| !!width=30%| !!width=15%| !!width=30%|
|-
|
|align=right|
|align=center|3–1
|
|-
|
|align=right|
|align=center|1–3
|
|-
|
|align=right|
|align=center|1–1
|
|-
|
|align=right|
|align=center|0–4
|
|-
|
|align=right|
|align=center|0–2
|
|-
|
|align=right|
|align=center|5–0
|

See also
 2004 UEFA European Under-19 Championship second qualifying round
 2004 UEFA European Under-19 Championship

External links
Results by RSSSF

1
UEFA European Under-19 Championship qualification